Jaapi or Japi (Assamese: জাপি) is a traditional conical hat from Assam, India similar to other Asian conical hats is made from tightly woven bamboo and/or cane and tokou paat (Trachycarpus martianus) a large, palm leaf. The word jaapi derives from jaap meaning a bundle of taku leaves. In the past, plain jaapi were used by ordinary people in Assam and by farmers for protection from the sun, while ornate jaapi were worn as a status symbol by royalty and nobility. Decorative sorudoi jaapi are made with intricate cloth designs (primarily red, white, green, blue, and black) that are integrated into the weaving.

History

The medieval Chutia kings used the Jaapi as a cultural symbol. The last Chutia king Nitipal gifted gold and silver embroidered Jaapis to the Ahom king Suhungmung as presents in his attempts for a treaty in the year 1523. After annexing Sadiya in 1524, the Ahom king received a lot of treasure and bounty, which included Jaapis. In the year 1525, the Ahom king gifted some of the silver Jaapis obtained from the Chutia king and other items, to negotiate peace with the Mongkawng chief Phukloimung, a Shan state in present Upper Myanmar (called Nora in Buranjis)  who had attacked Sadiya. During the Ahom rule, Jaapi-hajiya Khel (guild for making Jaapis) was monopolised by Chutias, which indicate that they were experts in weaving Jaapis. Apart from this, the Baro-Bhuyans of Central Assam are also said to have used Jaapis. As per the Satsari Buranji, the Ahom kings adopted the Tongali, Hasoti and Tokou-patia Japi from the Baro-Bhuyans.

Cultural symbol
Today the jaapi is a symbol of Assam. It is worn in a style of Bihu dance, used as protection against the elements, offered as a sign of respect in ceremonies, and placed as a decorative item around the house, especially in the walls as a welcome sign.

Originally Japi was an agricultural headgear by farmers to protect themselves from rain or sun's heat. The Bodo-Kacharis having agricultural as the main profession often used them in the rice fields. Similar headgears are also seen to be used all throughout East Asia. Bishnu Prasad Rabha added Japi dance to Assamese culture through Jaymati movie from Bodo community's Khofri Sibnai Mwsanai.

Types

 Sorudoi japi: Used by women, especially brides.
 Bordoi japi: Used by royalty since ancient times (Kamrupa).
 Panidoi/Haluwa japi:Used by farmers in fields.
 Garakhiya japi: Used by cattle herders.
 Pitha japi: Used as hoods, sometimes during cultivation.
 Tupi/Varun japi: Used in rain as protective hats.

See also

Conical Asian hat
Culture of Assam
List of hats and headgear
Textiles and dresses of Assam

Notes

References

External links
 Some information about Assamese culture
 Facts/Photos on Jaapi 
 Download Bihu video

History of Asian clothing
Hats
Textiles and clothing of Assam
Bamboo weaving